Ilisha Keisha Marie Jarrett (born January 8, 1977) is an American retired professional basketball player.

Sports career
Ilisha began her sports career in 1996 by playing for Mississippi State University and after five years, played in the FIBA professional women's basketball league. The 38-year-old American has played for Russian, Korean, Portuguese, Hungarian, Croatia and German clubs. She is co-owner of the Dominican Republic basketball team Samana Gladiatores.

Mississippi State and Alabama-Huntsville statistics

Source

Sexual assault incident
Jarrett moved to Gospić in Lika, Croatia in September 2004 as a reinforcement to Croatia's best women's basketball team Gospić-Industrogradnja, which had placed in the top sixteen teams in the FIBA Cup the previous season.

In 2005, a Croatian businessman, Joso Mraović approached Jarrett in a hotel and sexually assaulted her. Initially, judge Branko Milanović ruled that it was not rape because Mraović "only put his finger inside her anus", so it was ruled that the "anus was not a sex organ, nor was the finger, otherwise any unsolicited handshake could be characterized as rape". However, later in 2008, Mraović, then 58, was sentenced to three years in prison for battery, a physical delict per Croatian law. A year later, judge Milanović was relieved of his duties. The term "Lika-style handshake" (as an euphemism for anal fingering) became widespread in Croatia following the incident. Mraović passed away in November 2020 due to COVID-19.

References

American women's basketball players
1977 births
Living people
African-American basketball players
Sportspeople from Illinois
Place of birth missing (living people)
Basketball players from Birmingham, Alabama
Mississippi State Bulldogs women's basketball players
Alabama–Huntsville Chargers women's basketball players
21st-century African-American sportspeople
21st-century African-American women
20th-century African-American sportspeople
20th-century African-American women